The Canindé River is a seasonal waterway flowing into the Parnaiba River near Amarante in the State of Piauí in northeastern Brazil.  The stream flows for approx. 350 km from headwaters in the foothills on the Piaui/Pernambuco border (northwest of  Afrânio, Pernambuco) northwest into Piauí then through Paulistana and Oeiras to Amarante on the junction of the Canindé with the Parnaiba. Oeiras is the main commercial center in the Canindé River valley. The biome type along the river is caatinga, which is composed of typical northeastern Brazilian semiarid vegetation. The river and fauna and flora of the environs were described by the German naturalists Johann Baptist von Spix and Carl Friedrich Philipp von Martius during their travels in Brazil in April and May, 1819.

The Canindé and its tributary the Piauí River which enters it about 125 km below Oeiras, constitute what is often referred to as the Caninde-Piaui river system.  The Caninde / Piauí River basin with an area of approximately 75,000 km2, is the largest sub-basin (29.7%) of the Parnaíba River Basin, which constitutes 98.3% of the land area of the State of Piaui.

The Caninde-Piaui river system and its tributaries present a temporary torrential flow regime: flow rate is characterized by abrupt variations due to tropical storms
during the January - April rainy season.

Among the land-based economic activities of the Rio Caninde valley are the exploitation of Brazilian Wax palms (Copernicia prunifera) for the manufacture of carnauba wax, the extraction and commercialization of rubber from the Pará rubber tree (Hevea brasiliensis), and maniçoba (tapioca) from the Manioc plant (Manihot esculenta), and cattle ranching including dairy farming.

Etymology

The name of the river comes from the Tupi-Guarani Kanindé, and has several meanings:
 a tribe of Indians that inhabited the banks of rivers Quixeramobim and Banabuiú;
 a large tribe of the Tarairyu nation, that lived in the central region of the backlands of Ceará (Quixada, Canindé and High Banabuiú, Quixeramobim);
 a macaw with blue and yellow plumage, specifically Canindéyu from Kanindé, blue macaw + ju, yellow: the blue-and-yellow macaw (Ara ararauna, called Arara-caninde in Portuguese).

See also
List of rivers of Piauí

Notes

References

External links
Analysis of the basin of Canindé River - Government of State of Piaui
Historical context of the territory of the Caninde River Valley
EXECUTIVE SUMMARY: TERRITORY OF CANINDÉ RIVER VALLEY

Rivers of Piauí